Kokshetau—1 station (Stantsiya Kokshetau-1) also previously known as Kokchetav I station is the main railway station for commuter rail and long-distance trains departing from the city of Kokshetau, Kazakhstan, and an important stop along the Trans-Kazakhstan and South Siberian railways. It is one of two stations in the city.

It was built initially in 1922 and rebuilt in its current form in 1981. The station serves around average attendance of about 600 people.

The station complex provides long-distance and international services (such as Russia and Belarus), and short-distance service commuter trains (elektrichka) for suburbs, minor city stations, and nearby regions. The railway station sits at the eastern end of the long Abai Street, Kokshetau's central thoroughfare. A tall concrete clock guides you to the station.

History

The first building of the station dates back to 1920 with the launch of the Petropavlovsk—Kokchetav railway. In August, 1920, a decision was adopted to build a railroad from Petropavlovsk to Kokchetav.

In 1921 the construction of this railroad (263 km) started and was completed ahead of schedule by the summer of 1922 and became the first railway of the Soviet period built in Kazakhstan.

The first building of the Kokshetau-1 station was built in 1922, and opened on 2 June. It was then rebuilt in 1949 and served until 1981. The new building of Kokchetav-1 railway station was built in 1981.

Trains and destinations

International

Major Direct Domestic

High-speed rail

Public transport 
The station is served by the following municipal public transport services:

 Bus: 1, 4, 12, 16, 17, 18, 19, 22, 36

Station Square 

 The sculptural composition "Mother’s Blessing" placed near the station in 2001. The sculpture of a woman symbolizes the image of a mother who meets and sees off her children and who gives her blessing to them by holding her arms aloft. The monument is made of bronze. Total height is 14 meters.

See also
 Kazakhstan Railways
 Kokshetau Children's Railway

Gallery

References

External links
 Timetables 
 Kazakhstan Temir Zholy 

Railway stations in Akmola Region
Railway stations opened in 1922
Transport in Kokshetau
Kokchetav Oblast
Buildings and structures built in the Soviet Union
Transport infrastructure completed in 1922
Buildings and structures in Kokshetau
Buildings and structures in Akmola Region